San Pedro del Espino is a corregimiento in Santiago District, Veraguas Province, Panama with a population of 1,629 as of 2010. Its population as of 1990 was 1,336; its population as of 2000 was 1,463.

References

Corregimientos of Veraguas Province